Zophodia leithella is a species of snout moth in the genus Zophodia.

History 
It was described by Harrison Gray Dyar Jr. in 1928.

Location 
It is found in northern Venezuela and Colombia, in the Caribbean (Curaçao) and in southern Mexico.

Appearance 
The wingspan is 30–33 mm. The forewings are greyish brown with darker markings and the hindwings are almost wholly white in males and mainly fuscous in females.

Larval Behaviours & Life Cycle 
The larvae feed on Platyopuntia species. They are solitary and feed within the stem of their host plant. The larvae are greyish with broad transverse bands. Full-grown larvae cut through the cuticle of the host plant to form a trapdoor, the free edges of which are cemented to the surface. The cocoon is spun within the larval cavity and possesses a long neck extending to the trapdoor, which is pushed open by the emerging adult.

References

Moths described in 1928
Phycitini